The iMac Pro is an all-in-one personal computer and workstation designed, manufactured, and sold by Apple Inc. from 2017 to 2021. While it was sold, it was one of four desktop computers in the Macintosh lineup, sitting above the consumer range Mac Mini and iMac, and serving as an all-in-one alternative to the Mac Pro.

Background
In 2013, Apple replaced its tower Mac Pro workstation with a radically-redesigned model. The machine languished for years without any updates, and Apple later admitted that its small design and focus on dual graphics-processing unit had been a mistake. In April 2017, Apple convened a roundtable of journalists and executives to restate their commitment to professional Macs. As part of the announcement, a new monitor and Mac Pro were announced, but would not arrive that year; instead, Apple referenced new iMacs to fill the gap.

Design
The iMac Pro's chassis is the same as the 27-inch iMac it was sold alongside, but comes in a darker "space gray" finish, with the Magic Keyboard, Magic Mouse and Magic Trackpad accessories color-matched. The iMac Pro also has more connectivity options than the iMac, with four Thunderbolt 3 ports, two USB-A ports, a headphone jack, ethernet port, and SDXC card slot. The iMac Pro's stand was user-replaceable with a licensed OEM VESA mount kit sold by Apple. The mount uses zinc screws that may be prone to breaking.

Internally, the machine was completely reconfigured.

The processor, memory, and storage are not soldered and can be removed. Unlike the 27-inch iMac, the iMac Pro does not have a memory access hatch; memory upgrades require disassembling the display. 

The iMac Pro was the first Mac equipped with Apple's T2 chip, a custom Apple coprocessor. The T2 handles extra security. This results in a non-user-replaceable solid state drive as the SSD modules are paired cryptographically with the T2 chip, even though the SSD is not soldered on the motherboard like many MacBook models. It theoretically can be replaced as it is possible to remove it, although doing so requires an extensive disassembly, and only some drives are compatible.

Release
The iMac Pro was introduced at WWDC on June 5, 2017, and was released in December 2017. Apple billed it as "the most powerful Mac ever made". The configurations included an 8-, 10-, 14-, or 18-core Intel Xeon processor, 5K display, AMD Vega graphics, ECC memory, and 10 Gigabit Ethernet. 

The Mac Pro received minor updates after release. Configuration options for 256GB of memory and a Vega 64X GPU were added on March 19, 2019. Apple discontinued the 8-core model on August 4, 2020, making the 10-core model upgrade option the base model. The iMac Pro was discontinued on March 5, 2021, with Apple selling the computer while supplies lasted. It was delisted from Apple's website and online store on March 19, 2021. An indirect successor, the Mac Studio, was released on March 18, 2022, alongside the Apple Studio Display.

Reception
The iMac Pro was positively received. Jason Snell, writing for Macworld, said that the machine was clearly not for average customers, but filled a niche for users like himself who had drifted from using pro desktops to iMacs, but still wanted more power than Apple's consumer line could offer. Wired considered the iMac Pro a statement from Apple, renewing its commitment to pro Macs.

Technical specifications

References

Timeline of iMac models

External links
  – official site at Apple 

Pro
X86 Macintosh computers
Macintosh all-in-ones
Computer-related introductions in 2017